Rathje may refer to:

Peotone Mill, formerly known as the Rathje Mill, an historic mill in Peotone, Illinois, United States

People with the surname
Mike Rathje (born 1974), Canadian ice hockey player
Norm Rathje (1936–2011), American football player and coach
Tor Rathje Eckhoff (1964–2021), Norwegian YouTuber
S. Louis Rathje (born 1939), American judge
William Rathje (1945–2012), American archaeologist and professor

See also
Rathjen, a surname